Fort Mill High School (FMHS) is a public high school in Fort Mill, South Carolina, United States. It is part of the York County School District 4.

Achievements 

Two-time National Blue Ribbon School – 2004, 2018

Marching Band 
24 S.C. Marching Band State Championships:

Class 4A Champions—2003, 04, 05, 09, 12, 14
Class 3A Champions—1981, 85, 86, 87, 89, 90, 91, 92, 93, 95, 96, 97, 98, 99
Class 2A Champions—1976, 77, 82, 83

3-time Bands of America Regional Champion: Akron, Ohio in 2011, Powder Springs, Georgia in 2015, and Winston-Salem, NC in 2017. 7-time Band Grand National Semi-Finalist: 1992, 2000, 2002, 2003, 2005, 2016, and 2017. Marching Band 2005 Western Carolina Tournament of Champions Champion.

The Fort Mill High School Marching Band has also been featured in the Macy's Thanksgiving Parade, The Pasadena Rose Parade, has traveled to Dublin, Ireland to perform in the 2013 St. Patrick's Parade, and performed at the American Military Cemetery in Normandy, France in 2016.

State championships 
 Baseball: 1960, 1961, 2002
 Basketball - Boys: 1974, 2007
 Cross Country - Boys: 2006, 2021
 Cross Country - Girls: 2010
 Golf - Boys: 1976, 1984, 1985, 1986, 1988
 Lacrosse - Boys: 2011, 2014, 2019
 Lacrosse - Girls: 2012
 Soccer - Boys: 2012
 Softball: 2022
 Swimming - Boys: 2005, 2006, 2010, 2011
 Swimming - Girls: 2022
 Tennis - Boys: 1995, 1996, 1997, 1998, 1999
 Track - Girls: 2011

Notable alumni 

 Ernest Dixon, former NFL linebacker
 Cheslie Kryst, Miss USA 2019
 Robert "Daddy" Potts, former NFL player
 Charlie Rymer, professional golfer who played on the PGA Tour
 Melvin Stewart, two-time Olympic gold medalist swimmer, co-founder of SwimSwam
 Vance Walker, former NFL defensive end and Super Bowl 50 champion with the Denver Broncos

References

External links 
 

Educational institutions in the United States with year of establishment missing
Fort Mill, South Carolina
Public high schools in South Carolina
Schools in York County, South Carolina
1930 establishments in South Carolina